Highvision is the fourth album by the Japanese indie rock band Supercar. It was released on April 24, 2002, and peaked at 11th place of the Oricon Albums Chart.

In 2007, Rolling Stone Japan listed Highvision as number 86 among its "100 Greatest Japanese Rock Albums of All Time."

Track list

References

External links

2002 albums
Supercar (band) albums
Ki/oon Records albums